John Prentice was the Chairman of the Shanghai Municipal Council between 1901 and 1902.

Biography

Prentice was born on 7 August 1847 Beattock, Scotland, and educated at Greenock.

Prentice moved to Shanghai 1870 to join Muirhead & Co which was absorbed later by Boyd & Co..  Boyd & Co was subsequently absorbed by Shanghai Dock and Engineering Co, a major shipbuilding company.  Prentice rose through the ranks to become the controlling interest and principal of the firm.

He served on the Shanghai Municipal Council and was chairman from 1901 to 1902.

He died on 30 April 1925 following an attack of pneumonia in Shanghai.  He was buried in Bubbling Well Cemetery.

A bust of Prentice was placed in the hall of the French Club in Shanghai following his death.  A stained glass window in memoriam of Prentice was placed in the Union Church in Shanghai.  Route Prentice (now Jinxian Road) in the Shanghai French Concession was named after Prentice.

Marriage

Prentice married Jane Ann Law, the former wife of Mr Alexander Law.  She died in 1935 and was buried in the Prentice family plot with her husband.

References

History of Shanghai
Chairmen of the Shanghai Municipal Council
1925 deaths
Scottish businesspeople
Burials in Shanghai
1847 births